is a Japanese multimedia project co-developed by Kadokawa Corporation, music label Lantis, and animation studio Bandai Namco Filmworks (formerly known as Sunrise). The project is the fourth installment in the Love Live! franchise after Love Live! School Idol Project, Love Live! Sunshine!!, and Love Live! Nijigasaki High School Idol Club. An anime television series aired on NHK Educational TV from July to October 2021. A second season aired from July to October 2022. A third season has been announced.

Plot
The story is set in the  that lies between the Omotesando, Harajuku, and Aoyama neighborhoods of Tokyo. The school was originally going to be demolished, only to have instead recently reopened to accept students. Within a school that has not made a name for itself, along with no history or accomplishments to speak of, Kanon Shibuya and four other first year students discover the existence of "school idols" and set out to let their voices be heard. They form a school idol group named Liella!, and aim to become superstars in their own right one day.

Characters
Where appropriate, plot descriptions mentioned below refer to the anime television series. Other parts of the franchise, such as the manga and novel series, feature some variations in the storyline. The original five members are first-year students in the first season and advance as second-year students in the second season.

Liella!

Kanon is a high school second-year student who claims to be "someone with no standout characteristics." She has a fond appreciation for both singing and playing the guitar. However, she tends to tense up when she is set to perform in front of other people, which has caused her to pass out on several occasions on stage. Due to this, she failed the entrance exam for Yuigaoka Girls' music program, and ended up settling for the school's general academic program instead. Her family consists of a dad who works as a translator, a mom who runs a cafe, and a younger sister. She and her younger sister often help their mother with running the cafe, with one of her specialties being latte art. She keeps a chubby Eurasian scops owl as a pet named "Manmaru," which is also the cafe's popular mascot. She wears glasses and ties her hair up when at home. Kanon serves as the leader of Liella!, as well as lyricist and composer. She is part-Spanish because of her grandmother. In the second season, she became the student council vice president to help shoulder Ren's duty as student council president.

Keke is a second-year student who hails from Shanghai, China, having just recently moved to Japan—her mother's homeland—to become a school idol, and is responsible for recruiting new members for the club. Despite wanting to become a school idol, Keke lacks in physical stamina and has a hard time keeping up with her fellow members. She holds the JLPT N1 certificate. She enjoys stage costumes and has a hobby of creating and restoring them. As such, she serves as the club's official wardrobe supervisor. She has a habit of speaking in Mandarin when she gets overly excited.

Chisato is a second-year student and Kanon's childhood friend who is good at breakdancing. She is an energetic girl who can easily befriend anyone she meets. Chisato likes anything that is round shaped; especially Kanon's pet Manmaru, who seems to be wary around Chisato when she comes to visit. She is also known to keep up to date on gossip and rumors that are spread around the school. Despite having an interest in school idols, Chisato initially does not want to become one as she thinks she is better off supporting Kanon instead.  She initially belonged to Yuigaoka's music program but moved the general program after deciding to join the school idols. She has a part time job at a takoyaki shop, which is also her favorite food. She is distinguishable with her twin tail hairstyle and hair buns. She became the School Idol Club's president in second season.

Sumire is a second-year student and a posh shrine maiden who lives at a well-known and respected community shrine located near the school. Her personality tends to come off as somewhat stuck up to strangers, and initially appears as slightly antisocial. She was a former child actress who struggled to receive headlining roles in any project she worked on. Because of her experience in the world of show business, she expected to take the position of center within Liella!, eventually being voted in last place with Kanon taking the lead. She has a younger sister. Due to her knowledge of the entertainment industry, she has several hidden talents, one of which being freestyle hip hop. Her catchphrase is "Galaxy!"

Ren is a second-year student who is the daughter of the school founder, Hana Hazuki, as well as the student council president. She belongs to the music program. She is polite, disciplined, and known for her strict personality. She lives nearby the school and takes pride in the rich history of Yuigaoka. Initially, she is unfriendly and strict towards the school idol club, doing everything in her power to shut down opportunities that come by. It is revealed that Ren's mother had died due to illness, and Ren's harsh attitude to school idols came from a misconception that Hana had regretted becoming a school idol, but the truth is eventually divulged that being a school idol was one of Hana's most treasured memories from her high school years. Following in her mother's footsteps, Ren decides to join the unit as the group's fifth member.

Kinako is a first-year student from Hokkaido who lives on her own and isn't used to city living. She was recruited by Kanon to become a school idol after getting lost on campus. Although she's shy, Kinako tends to be very loud and easily startled. She has a habit of referring to herself in the third person and ends her sentence with "~ssu." 

Mei is a first-year student who is often misunderstood due to her "scary eyes," which turns out to be a side effect of her poor eyesight. She speaks in an abrasive tone and comes off as frightening to other students, but is secretly a fan of school idols, mainly Liella! and enrolled Yuigaoka Girls to get closer to Liella!. She is very close with Shiki and confides in her about her fondness for school idols. 

Shiki is a first-year student who has difficulty expressing emotions. Being one of the school's only science club members, she can usually be found spending her free time in the science club room inventing strange gadgets, one of which being a pair of robotic roller skates. She and Mei have been friends from junior high school, and she considers Mei to be one of the most important people in her life. She initially joins the school idol club on a trial period in an attempt to bait Mei into joining. Eventually, she joins the group in order to encourage Mei to follow her dreams.

A popular "L-tuber" who decided to become a school idol to gain more followers and money. She initially gets closer to Liella! in order to obtain money through ad revenue as an L-Tuber, offering to be the group's "producer" and making short form vlogs of them. After spending some time at Hokkaido alongside the other first year members of the group, she took a liking to the charm of school idols. Kanon invites her to join Liella!, and she becomes the group's ninth member. She frequently ends her sentences with "~desu no." Her catchphrase is "Oninuts!"

Others

Aria is Kanon's younger sister, who is close yet somewhat paranoid about her sister's passion for becoming a school idol. Like Kanon, she's also helping with her mother's running a cafe.

 & Yuna Yūki
Yuuna and Mao are the members of Sunny Passion, a duo school idol unit originated from Kōzu-shima who inspired Keke to move to Japan and become a school idol. Yuuna is the cheerful of the duo: she is ponytailed and has shark-like teeth. Mao is more reserved, distinguishable from her long, purple hair. The group won Love Live! in the first season and aiming to break a record and win Love Live! again in second season.

A solo school idol from Austria who is infatuated with Kanon. She comes off as reserved and competitive in comparison to Sunny Passion, despite having no interest in either school idols or Love Live!. It is revealed that she failed her entrance exam for a prestigious music school in her home country, and winning Love Live! in Japan was a condition for her to gain school acceptance. After Liella! was chosen to advance to the finals of Love Live!, her family suggested she bring Kanon back with her to Austria instead and learn music from her, much to her disagreement. She is in her third year of middle school.

Development
The franchise announced a separate anime adaptation other than Love Live! Nijigasaki High School Idol Club in January 2020, which features a new set of characters, who are all first-year students in a newly reopened school originally on the verge of demolition. The school lies between the Omotesando, Harajuku, and Aoyama neighborhoods of Tokyo. In addition, an audition for one of the main cast was held on March 12, 2020, but was postponed due to COVID-19. Atsushi Saitō serves as the character design adapting style of the series' original character designer Yūhei Murota. The main characters names were also announced: Kanon Shibuya, Tang Keke, Chisato Arashi, Sumire Heanna, and Ren Hazuki.

The project's name, Love Live! Superstar!! was announced in July through the series' exclusive magazine Love Live! Days. In September, the school idol group's name, "Liella!" was also chosen through fans' votes. The name was chosen among 16 options that fans could vote for. Behind the group's name lies the feelings of the hope that the small stars of today who have their own brilliance will become superstars someday. 

The cast of the initial five main characters was later revealed in December 2020: Sayuri Date, Liyuu, Nako Misaki, Naomi Payton, and Nagisa Aoyama. Date and Aoyama are members who passed the open audition that was held earlier in the year. The group's debut single,  released on April 7, 2021.

Broadcast and distribution

The anime television series is animated by Bandai Namco Filmworks and directed by Takahiko Kyogoku, with Jukki Hanada handling series composition and Atsushi Saito designing the characters. Yoshiaki Fujisawa returns from his work on Love Live! School Idol Project to compose the music. The series aired on NHK Educational TV from July 11 to October 17, 2021. Funimation has licensed the series for international releases. Liella! perform both the opening and ending themes, titled "Start!! True Dreams" and  respectively, from episode 2 onwards. Special animated music videos made specifically for the NHK Educational TV broadcast featuring original songs by Liella! air after each episode titled "Songs of Liella!".

On October 24, 2021, it was announced during a live screening event of the first season that a second season is currently in production. The announcement was uploaded to the official Love Live! Series YouTube channel shortly after the event. The second season aired from July 17 to October 9, 2022. The second season features four additional Liella! members. The second season also features "Song of Liella."

A third season was announced following the conclusion of the second season. The staff will be holding auditions for a new Liella! cast member.

Other media
Various Liella! songs were playable through Love Live! School Idol Festival and its spin-off game School Idol Festival All Stars for limited amounts of time. SR cards of Liella! members were also made available through a special login bonus in School Idol Festival as commemoration of the anime series' broadcast.

Controversy
In June 2021, the Love Live! staff issued an apology for having modeled the main character’s family café after the exterior of Café Casa, a real café in Shibuya. The staff admitted that they had used the café’s likeness without permission or "prior consideration,” leading to the café's staff receiving infringements of their privacy via social media and reviews; additionally, the increased presence of Love Live! fans at the café affected its intended mood and atmosphere. The design of the café in the anime was subsequently changed so it less resembled Café Casa.

Notes

References

External links
 

Animated musical groups
Anime spin-offs
Animation controversies in television
Anime and manga controversies
Crunchyroll anime
Dengeki G's Magazine
Japanese idols in anime and manga
Japanese musical groups
Lantis (company)
Love Live!
Music in anime and manga
NHK original programming
School life in anime and manga
Sunrise (company)
Upcoming anime television series